Rodolfo Abularach (January 7, 1933 – August 30, 2020) was a Guatemalan painter and printmaker of Palestinian descent.

Biography
He was born in Guatemala City. His work focuses mainly on the human eye. He attended the Escuela Nacional de las Artes Plásticas in Guatemala City, starting in 1947 and graduating in 1954. Later on, he studied in New York City on a Guatemalan government grant, studying at the Arts Student League and Graphic Arts center.

His works were featured in a 2019 exhibition at the Art Museum of the Americas in Washington, D.C.

Permanent collections 
Permanent Collections (selection)

THE ATELIER ART SOCIETY, the Netherlands  

Metropolitan Museum, New York

MOMA - Museum of Modern Art, New York

AMA - Art Museum of the Americas (OEA), Washington, D.C.

Collection of Chase Manhattan Bank, New York

New York Public Library, New York

New York Interchem, New York

Norton Simon Museum, Pasadena, California

Collection Grundwald

Sala Luis Angel Arango, Bogotá, Colombia

Instituto de Cultura Hispánica, Madrid, Spain

University of Massachusetts, Massachusetts

High Museum of Art, Atlanta, Georgia

Museo de Arte Moderno, Bogotá, Colombia

Museo de la Universidad de Puerto Rico, Puerto Rico

Museo de Arte, Caracas, Venezuela

Sala Mendoza, Fundación Mendoza, Caracas, Venezuela

Cartón y Papel de México, México, D.F.

Museo Cuevas, México DF

IDB - Inter-American Development Bank, Washington, D.C.

SFMOMA - San Francisco Museum of Modern Art, San Francisco, California

Colección Leticia Guerrero, Banco de Quito, Quito, Ecuador

MUNAM - Museo de Arte Moderno, Ciudad de Guatemala

Dirección de Artes, El Salvador

Museo de la “Pinacoteca Nacional”, La Paz, Bolivia

Museo de Arte Contemporáneo, Sao Paulo, Brasil

Museo de Arte “La Tertulia”, Cali, Colombia

Fleming Museum of Art, Vermont

Milwaukee Art Museum (MAM), Milwaukee, Wisconsin

Musée d’Art et d’Histoire, Geneva, Switzerland

Universidad Central de Venezuela, Venezuela

Lowe Art Museum, Miami

Alternative Center for International Arts, New York

LACMA - Los Angeles County Museum of Art, Los Angeles, California

National Museum of Warsaw, Warsaw, Poland

Consejo Mundial de Grabado, San Francisco, California

Museum of Art, Bagdad, Iraq

Museum of Art, Cairo, Egypt

The University of Texas at Austin, Austin, Texas

Amon Carter Museum of American Art, Fort Worth,Texas

Museo Panarte, Panamá

Royal Museum of Art, Copenhagen, Denmark

Museo Del Barrio, New York

Banco de Guatemala, Guatemala

Museum of International and Contemporary Graphic Arts, Fredrikstad, Norway

Awards 
1957.   First Prize in Painting: "Central American Contest" Guatemala City

1959.   Prize in Drawing, V Biennial, Sao Paulo, Brazil

1961.   Prize in Drawing, New York University, NY

1963.   First Prize in Drawing, "Current Art of America and Spain", Madrid, Spain

1965    First Prize in Painting, "Salon Esso de Jóvenes Artistas", El Salvador, C.A.

1967    First Prize in Drawing, Universidad Central, Caracas, Venezuela

1969    First Prize in Drawing, IX Festival of Art, Cali, Colombia

1970    Prize in Graphic Arts, Silvermine Guild of Artists, Connecticut

Foreign Relations Award, Biennial of American Graphic Arts, Santiago, Chile

First Prize in Drawing, National Drawing Exhibition, San Francisco Museum of Art, San Francisco, California

First Prize in Drawing, Pan American Exhibition of Graphic Arts, Cali, Colombia

1971    Prize in Graphic Arts, IV International Miniature Graphics Exhibition, New York, NY

1972    Prize in Graphic Arts, II Latin American Biennial of Graphic Arts, San Juan, Puerto Rico

1977    Prize in Graphic Arts, I Biennial of American Art, Venezuela

1980    Special Edition Award and Merit Award, III International Biennial, World Print Council, San Francisco, California

1987    Silver Medal, Latin American Biennial, Buenos Aires, Argentina

2003    Tribute Municipality of Guatemala;

2010    Tribute "Artist of the Year" from the Rozas Botrán Foundation, Guatemala

2017    Medal of the Orden del Arrayán, Guatemala

2019    Carlos Mérida” Award, Guatemala

Solo shows (more than 100 shows) 
1947    Galería Nacional de Turismo, Ciudad de Guatemala

1954    Galería Arcadi, Ciudad de Guatemala

1955    Studies in Pen and Ink, Escuela de Artes Plásticas del Museo Arqueológico de Guatemala

1961    David Herbert Gallery, New York, NY

1966    Sala L.A. Arango, Banco de la Republica, Bogotá, Colombia

1967    Galería Schaefer-Diaz, Guatemala City

1969    Bucholz Gallery, Munich, Germany

1970    Galería Colibri, San Juan, Puerto Rico;  Galería Vertebra, Cuidad de Guatemala; Graham Gallery, New York, NY; Pyramid Gallery, Washington D.C.

1971    Galería San Diego, Bogotá, Colombia;

1972    Westbeth Gallery, New York, NY

1973    Museo de la Universidad de Puerto Rico, Puerto Rico; “Sala Estudio Actual” Caracas, Venezuela; Galería Fundación, Caracas, Venezuela

1974    Museo de Arte Moderno, Bogotá, Colombia; Escuela Nacional de Artes Plásticas, Ciudad de Guatemala; Galería Pacanis, México D.F.; Galería Forma, San Salvador, El Salvador.

1975    Galería Siglo Veintiuno, Quito, Ecuador; Galería Briseno, Lima, Perú

1976    Balería Echandi, Ministerio de Cultura, San José, Costa Rica; Galería Tague, Managua, Nicaragua; Galería Estructura, Panamá City; Alternative Center of the Arts, Nueva York, NY

1977    Arte Actual de Iberoamerica, Madrid, Spain

1978    Galería San Diego, Bogotá, Colombia; Galería El Túnel, Guatemala City; Universidad de Medellín, Medellín, Colombia

1979    La Galería, Quito, Ecuador ; Galería Panarte, Panamá City, Panamá

1980    Galería Partes, Medellín, Colombia

1981    Museo Rayo, Roldanillo, Colombia; Moss Gallery, San Francisco, California; Miami Dade Public Library System, Miami, Florida; Galería Arte 80, Panamá City, Panamá

1982    Centro de Arte Actual, Pereira, Colombia; Borjeson Gallery, Malmo, Sweden; Galería Atenea, Barranquilla, Colombia; Galería Siete, Caracas, Venezuela

1983    Galería Diners, Bogotá, Colombia; Galería Etcétera, Ciudad de Panamá

1985    Museo Ixchel Guatemala City

1986    Galería Casa de la Cultura, Santa Cruz, Bolivia; Museo Nacional de Arte, La Paz, Bolivia; Centro Cultural Portales, Cochabamba, Bolivia;Galería Época, Santiago de Chile

1988    Galería del Patronato de Bellas Artes, Ciudad de Guatemala

1989    Galería del Patronato de Bellas Artes, Ciudad de Guatemala; Galería El Túnel, Guatemala City

1991    Galería Plástica Contemporánea, Ciudad de Guatemala; Art Miami 91, Miami, Florida

1992    Museo Rayo, Roldanillo, Colombia; Museo Brattlebord, Art Center, Vermont

1994    Museo de Arte Contemporáneo de Panamá

1996    Esculturas de Rodolfo Abularach, Galería “El Ático”, Ciudad de Guatemala

1997    Galería “Valanti”, San José, Costa Rica; Retrospectiva Museo de Arte Contemporáneo Paiz, Ciudad de Guatemala; Anita Shapolsky Gallery, New York, NY

1998    Aldo Castillo Gallery, Chicago, Illinois

1999    “Volcanos and other Fires” CDS Gallery, New York, NY

2000    Museo Ixchel (Arte Religioso), Ciudad de Guatemala

2005    Centro Cultural de España y Centros de Formación de la Cooperación Española, Ciudad de Guatemala

2006    Proyecto Cultural El Sitio, Antigua Guatemala, Guatemala

2007    Centro Cultural de España, Ciudad de Guatemala

2008    Retrospectiva, Museo Santo Domingo, Antigua Guatemala

2010    Galería El Túnel, Ciudad de Guatemala

2011    Museo Rayo, Colombia

2013   Museo Rayo, Colombia

2016  Galería Sol Del Río, Ciudad de Guatemala

2017  Centro Municipal de Arte - Correos, Guatemala

2019  Municipalidad de Guatemala

2020  AMA - Art Museum of the Americas (OEA), Washington DC

2021  Museo nacional Carlos Merida - MUNAM, Ciudad de Guatemala

References

1933 births
2020 deaths
People from Guatemala City
20th-century Guatemalan painters
Guatemalan people of Palestinian descent
21st-century Guatemalan painters
Guatemalan printmakers
20th-century printmakers
21st-century printmakers
20th-century Guatemalan male artists
21st-century Guatemalan male artists